Castello Tramontano is a 16th century fortification in Matera.

History
Castello Tramontano is situated on the lapel hill, above the historical centre of Matera.

The Castello was constructed in Aragonese style, with a central male and two lower side towers, both round, scalloped, and equipped with loops. Construction began in 1501 by Giovanni Carlo Tramontano, Count of Matera. The king of Naples, Ferdinand II, had promised the Materrani people that he would not give the city to any more feudal lords, after Matera had already freed itself several times from the feudal yoke by paying various ransoms in order to remain a free city. Recognition of such a status is directly dependent on the Crown. Instead the Count sets, which boasted claims against the royal treasury, asked and obtained the Matera County in 1496.

The Count soon became enfeebled by the Materani because he was burdened by debts. In order to cope with his situation, the Count heavily taxed the Materrani people. This heavy taxation allowed for the construction of the castle, which was situated on a hill dominating the city, outside the city walls, with the purpose of feudal control of the surrounding lands rather than defense of the city itself. 25,000 ducats were spent in total on the construction of the castle.

It's believed that then the construction should have included other defensive towers, one of which was found under the central Piazza Vittorio Veneto in Matera together with other underground developments. 

In response, some dissatisfied citizens gathered together and hid behind a stone, which has since been called "u pizzon 'du mal consigghj" (ie "stone of bad advice"), and organized a coup against the Count. On December 29, 1514, the Count was assassinated in a side street leaving the Cathedral of the same name, which was later called "Way of Ransom".

The castle thus remained unfinished. Restoration work began in 2008, owing to the castle and surrounding park falling into disrepair. Notably, these restorations aim to renovate the moat alongside and the tufa walls. The project is financed by lottery funds, but it is currently closed to the public.

See also
City of Matera

References

Bibliography

Castles in Basilicata
Castle
Buildings and structures in the Province of Matera